Siphoniidae is an extinct family of sea sponges belonging to the class Demospongiae.

Fossil records
This family is known in the fossil records of the Jurassic and Cretaceous of Europe (from about 155.7 to 66.043 million years ago).

Genera
 Aulaxinia Zittel, 1878
 Callopegma Zittel, 1878
 Calymmatina Zittel, 1878
 Craterella Schrammen, 1901
 Hallirhoa Lamouroux, 1821
 Jerea Lamouroux, 1821
 Kalpinella Hinde, 1884
 Paraspelaeum Schrammen, 1924
 Phymatella Zittel, 1878
 Phymoracia Pomel, 1872
 Polyierea Fromentel, 1860
 Siphonia Goldfuss, 1826
 Trachysycon Zittel, 1878
 Turonia Michelin, 1847

References

Sponge families
Tetractinomorpha